Lewisia triphylla is a species of flowering plant in the family Montiaceae known by the common name threeleaf lewisia. It is native to western North America from British Columbia to California to Colorado, where it grows in mountain and forest habitat, often in wet, rocky alpine areas where it may bloom through the snowmelt. This is a perennial herb growing from a fibrous taproot and corm unit. Instead of a basal rosette like many other Lewisia species it produces 2 to 5 short, slender, fleshy leaves from the lower part of the stem, which may be at or under the soil surface. The small stem bears an inflorescence of 1 to 25 flowers. The flower has 5 to 9 small white or pinkish petals often marked with darker veining or stripes.

External links
Jepson Manual Treatment
Photo gallery

triphylla
Flora of the Northwestern United States
Flora of California
Flora of the Cascade Range
Flora of the Klamath Mountains
Flora of the Rocky Mountains
Flora of the Sierra Nevada (United States)
Flora without expected TNC conservation status